The Men's decathlon competition at the 1976 Summer Olympics in Montreal, Quebec, Canada, was held at the Olympic Stadium on 29–30 July.

Competition format
The decathlon consists of ten track and field events, with a points system that awards higher scores for better results in each of the ten components. The athletes all compete in one competition with no elimination rounds. At the end of competition, if two athletes are tied, the athlete who has received more points in the greater number of events is the winner.

Records
Before the competition, the existing World and Olympic records were as follows.

Overall results
Key

Notes

References

External links
 Official Olympic Report , la84foundation.org. Retrieved August 18, 2012.

Decathlon
1976
Men's events at the 1976 Summer Olympics